William Chomsky (born Ze'ev Chomsky; ; January 15, 1896 – July 19, 1977) was an American scholar of the Hebrew language. He was born in the Russian Empire (now Ukraine) and settled in the United States in 1913.

From 1924 until 1969, he was a member of the faculty at the Jewish teacher-training institution Gratz College, becoming faculty president in 1932. In 1955, he also began teaching courses at Dropsie College, to which he was affiliated until 1977.

Background and early life
William Chomsky was born in 1896 in Kupil in the Volhynian Governorate of the Russian Empire (in present-day Ukraine). After immigrating to the United States in 1913, to avoid serving in the Czarist army, he worked in sweatshops in Baltimore before gaining employment teaching at the city's Hebrew elementary schools, using his money to fund his studies at Johns Hopkins University. After moving to Philadelphia, Chomsky became the superintendent (principal) of the Mikveh Israel religious school from 1923.

At Gratz and Dropsie colleges
From 1924, Chomsky additionally taught  at Gratz College, the oldest teacher-training college in the United States. He became the faculty president of Gratz in 1932. He became faculty chairman in 1949, retiring from this position in 1969. He was also a professor of Hebrew at Dropsie College from 1955–77.

Chomsky was a specialist of the history of the Hebrew grammatical tradition, before and after David Kimhi (1160–1235). His Associated Press obituary (published in The New York Times) describes him as "one of the world's foremost Hebrew grammarians". Independently, he was involved in researching Medieval Hebrew, eventually authoring a series of books on the language: How to Teach Hebrew in the Elementary Grades (1946), Hebrew, the Story of a Living Language (1947), Hebrew, the Eternal Language (1957), Teaching and Learning (1959), and an edited version of David Kimhi's Hebrew Grammar (1952).

Described by Carlos Otero in Chomsky and the Libertarian Tradition as a "very warm, gentle, and engaging" individual, William Chomsky placed a great emphasis on educating people so that they would be "well integrated, free and independent in their thinking, and eager to participate in making life more meaningful and worthwhile for all."

Personal life
On August 19, 1927, Chomsky married Elsie Simonofsky (1903–1972), a native of Babruysk, who was raised in the United States from 1906. She also taught at Gratz College. The couple had two sons: Noam (born 1928), the linguist and activist, and David Eli (1934–2021), a physician. The year after his first wife's death, William Chomsky married Ruth Schendel, by then widowed, who was the mother of one of his elder son's childhood friends.

Selected bibliography
Chomsky, William: How the Study of Hebrew Grammar Began and Developed; The Jewish Quarterly Review, New Ser., Vol. 35, No. 3. (Jan., 1945), pp. 281–301 JStor
 Chomsky, William: How to Teach Hebrew in the Elementary Grades; New York, The United Synagogue Commission on Jewish Education, XIV 295 p. 22 cm. 1946.
 Chomsky, William: David Kimhi's Hebrew Grammar: (Mikhlol) Systematically Presented and Critically Annotated by William Chomsky; Bloch Pub Co, New York, for Dropsie College, XXXIV 427 p. 23 cm, 1952 (available in paperback as 2001 edition)
 Chomsky, William: Hebrew: The Eternal Language; Jewish Publication Society of America, Philadelphia 1964, c1957, other edition: June 1975,

References

Sources 

 

1896 births
1977 deaths
People from Khmelnytskyi Oblast
People from Starokonstantinovsky Uyezd
Ukrainian Jews
Emigrants from the Russian Empire to the United States
American people of Ukrainian-Jewish descent
Industrial Workers of the World members
Dropsie College faculty
Gratz College
History of linguistics
Jewish grammarians
Jewish socialists
Grammarians of Hebrew
William
People from Baltimore